Costa Georgiadis (born 1 January 1964) is an Australian landscape architect and television presenter. He is a second generation Australian of Greek descent. Georgiadis is currently hosting Gardening Australia on ABC and previously appeared as 'Costa the Garden Gnome' in the ABC Kids program Get Grubby TV.

Early life
Georgiadis was born in Sydney and grew up in North Bondi on the same street as his grandparents and uncle. He is the youngest of three children. His father, Stan, was an electrician.

Career
Georgiadis' grandparents fostered his early interest in gardening. He worked as a landscaper whilst studying landscape architecture at University of New South Wales, where he developed an interest in sustainability.

From 2009 to 2011, he presented SBS's Costa's Garden Odyssey, a programme that explored the relationship between gardening, sustainability, and spirituality.

On 20 December 2011 the ABC announced that Georgiadis would replace Stephen Ryan as the host of Gardening Australia.

In 2014, Georgiadis starred as 'Costa the Garden Gnome' in Get Grubby TV on ABC Kids.

Awards and nominations
For his hosting role on Gardening Australia, Georgiadis won the Silver Logie for Most Popular Presenter and was nominated for the Gold Logie for Most Popular Personality on Australian Television at the 2019 Logie Awards.

References

Australian television personalities
Australian people of Greek descent
Living people
Australian horticulturists
1964 births